Simple Man is the sixteenth studio album by Charlie Daniels and the thirteenth as the Charlie Daniels Band, released on October 17, 1989.  The album's most memorable song is the titular song, "Simple Man", which is not related to the Lynyrd Skynyrd song of the same name.  "It's My Life" is a shorter version of a jam song previously released on their 1976 album, Saddle Tramp.

Track listing
 "(What This World Needs Is) A Few More Rednecks" (Charlie Daniels, Taz DiGregorio, Charles Hayward, Jack Gavin) - 3:44
 "Was It 26" (Don Sampson) - 3:50
 "Oh Atlanta" (Daniels, DiGregorio, Hayward, Gavin) - 3:19
 "Midnight Wind" - (Daniels, Tom Crain, DiGregorio, Hayward, Gavin) - 3:20
 "Saturday Night Down South" (Daniels, DiGregorio, Gavin, Hayward) - 3:04
 "Play Me Some Fiddle" (Daniels, DiGregorio, Hayward, Gavin) - 4:25
 "Simple Man" (Daniels, DiGregorio, Hayward, Gavin) - 3:24
 "Old Rock 'N Roller" (Daniels, DiGregorio, Hayward, Gavin) - 2:58
 "Mister DJ" - (Daniels, Crain, DiGregario, Hayward, Gavin) - 3:52
 "It's My Life" - (Daniels, Crain, DiGregorio, Fred Edwards, Hayward, Don Murray) - 3:32

Personnel
The Charlie Daniels Band:
Charlie Daniels - Guitar, fiddle, vocals
Bruce Ray Brown - Guitar, vocals
Taz DiGregorio - keyboards
Julian King - trumpet
Jack Gavin - drums, percussion
Charles Hayward - Bass

Production
Producer: James Stroud
Engineer: Lynn Peterzell
Assisted by: Julian King, Tom Oates
Cover photographer: David Michael Kennedy

Catalog number
CD Catalog Number: Epic Records EK 45316

Chart performance

Weekly charts

Year-end charts

Singles

Certifications

References

1989 albums
Epic Records albums
Charlie Daniels albums
Albums produced by James Stroud